Belanagar railway station is a Kolkata Suburban Railway station on the Howrah–Bardhaman chord line operated by Eastern Railway zone of Indian Railways. It is situated at Bally Jagachha Block, Belanagar in Howrah district in the Indian state of West Bengal. Number of EMU trains stop at Belanagar railway station. This railway station is named after Bela Mitra, a freedom fighter and social activist. This was the first Railway station in India named after any Indian woman.

History
The Howrah–Bardhaman chord, the 95 kilometers railway line was constructed in 1917. It was connected with  through Dankuni after construction of Vivekananda Setu in 1932.  to Bardhaman chord line including Belanagar railway station was electrified in 1964–66.

References

Railway stations in Howrah district
Howrah railway division
Kolkata Suburban Railway stations